The Kennedys of Massachusetts  is a 1990 TV miniseries that aired on ABC. Focusing mainly on the fifty-four year marriage of Joseph P. Kennedy, Sr. and Rose Kennedy. The events depicted in the series are based upon the book by Doris Kearns Goodwin titled The Fitzgeralds and the Kennedys : An American Saga. The series aired across three nights, and earned an Emmy and a Golden Globe.

Synopsis
The series begins in Boston in 1906, prior to John F. Fitzgerald being sworn in as city mayor. The Kennedys, as well as Fitzgerald's daughters, most notably Rose attend the swearing in ceremony. Joe Kennedy is shown to be smitten with Rose. The first episode covers their courtship, education, marriage and growth of their family, as well as Joe's affair with actress Gloria Swanson. Although Rose briefly leaves Joe, John persuades his daughter to return to her husband.

The second episode focuses on the eldest Kennedy children Joe Jr, Jack and Kathleen, as well Joe's appointment as Ambassador to England. Joe Jr's academic success and his father's favouritism bothers Jack, who feels he is equally as intelligent as his brother.

Cast
William Petersen as Joseph P. "Joe" Kennedy, Sr.
Annette O'Toole as Rose Kennedy
Charles Durning as John F. Fitzgerald
Tracy Pollan as Kathleen "Kick" Kennedy
Kelsey Nichols: Ages 8–9
Pat Hingle as P.J. Kennedy
Steven Weber as John F. "Jack" Kennedy
Christina Nikitas: Ages 2–3
Thomas Krajewski: Ages 9–12
Campbell Scott as Joseph P. "Joe" Kennedy, Jr.
Dante Magnani: Ages 2–4
Michael Goodwin: Ages 11–12
Madolyn Smith as Gloria Swanson
Olek Krupa as Erich Von Stroheim
Josef Sommer as Franklin D. Roosevelt
Randle Mell as Robert F. "Bobby" Kennedy
Will Gardner: Age 7
Casey Affleck: Ages 12–15
Kristen Kelly as Patricia Kennedy
Karen Chaffee: Ages 13–14 
Ryan Shaugnessy and Matthew Dundas as Edward Moore "Ted" Kennedy: Shaughnessy plays Ted ages 5–6, and Dundas plays him at ages 12–14.
Beth Herzig as Jean Kennedy
Danielle Schonback: Ages 9–12
Deirdre Lovejoy as Rosemary Kennedy
Jennifer Walsh: Ages 1–4 
Remi Nichols: Ages 8–11
Halina Radosz as Eunice Kennedy

Ratings

See also
 Cultural depictions of John F. Kennedy

References

External links

Kennedy family
1990s American television miniseries
American biographical series
Films about John F. Kennedy
Films about Robert F. Kennedy
Films directed by Lamont Johnson
Films scored by Laurence Rosenthal
Cultural depictions of John F. Kennedy
Cultural depictions of Robert F. Kennedy
Cultural depictions of Franklin D. Roosevelt
American Broadcasting Company original programming